The position of Secretary for Petroleum is a now defunct office in the United Kingdom Government, associated with the Board of Trade.

In 1929, the Secretary for Mines (now also defunct) took over responsibility for petroleum.

In 1939 the Petroleum Board assumed responsibility for the  coordination of the petroleum 'pool' for oil supplies (except  oil for the Royal Navy).

In 1940, the department was divided with Geoffrey Lloyd and Sir Alfred Faulkner becoming respectively Secretary and Permanent Under-Secretary for Petroleum and David Grenfell and Sir Alfred Hurst respectively Secretary and Permanent Under-Secretary for Mines.

On 11 June 1942, both these sub-departments of the Board of Trade were transferred to the new Ministry of Fuel and Power, then later the Department of Trade and Industry.

Secretaries for Petroleum 1940-1942 

Mines, Secretary for
Defunct ministerial offices in the United Kingdom